Illertissen is a town in the district of Neu-Ulm in Bavaria. It is situated approximately 20 km south from Ulm nearby the river Iller.

Coat of arms

The coat of arms lent by Erhard Vöhlin in the year 1530 shows an upright standing lion in red, covered by a black bar with three "P"s in silver capital letters. They stand for Pugnamus pro pace (from the Latin), meaning For peace we fight (not "Pugnamus pro Papa" which means "For the Pope we fight" as has been erroneously suggested.)

History

The oldest evidence of settlement in Illertissen goes back to the beginning of the 6th century A.D. The first documented mention, going by the name "Tussa", was in the year 954. This was on the occasion of the reconciliation by Ulrich, Bishop of Augsburg and the then bishop of Chur, King Otto I., and his son Duke Liudolf of Swabia. The occasion was a military alliance at Lechfeld, with the goal of preventing further penetrations by the Magyars. The three "P"s in the coat of arms may have originated from this event.

From the 12th century to the 13th century the castle of Tissen was developed by the Counts of Kirchberg. Today, the castle is known as the Vöhlin château. Already in 1430 the rule of Kirchberg became the seat of jurisdiction through Emperor Sigismund for the village of Tissen. From this time on, trade and handcraft blossomed in the region. Beside the farmers and the craftsmen in Illertissen also brewers and webbers were resident. The trade house of the Vöhlin (1520-1757), a patrician family from Memmingen mostly determined the history of Illertissen. In the 18th century the time of the Vöhlin ended with their financial bankruptcy and the sale of the rule (1756) to the Bavarian elector Maximilian III. Since 1803 the château is in possession of the Bavarian state. There were accommodated the offices for pension, district, federal state parliament and finances and also the district court. Since 1983 the Bee- and homeland museum is accommodated in the free rooms.

An important development thrust for the agrarian market was brought by building the train line Ulm - Oberstdorf in 1861/62, the so-called Illertalbahn. West of the train line industry companies settled, the number of inhabitants rose from 1,000 in the year 1800 to 2,500 in the year 1930. From the 1923 inflation the market municipality recovered in 1926. Then came the Nazi regime and the World War II, a time of fall. Three years after the war the currency reorganization and the free-market economy led in an upswing like never before. New production branches settled. Thus Illertissen could switch itself into the industrializing without destroying the natural living room, the social equilibrium or the skyline. In addition also the refugees of homeland made a remarkable contribution. Straight the 1971 integrated quarter Betlinshausen as well as 1978 in the framework of the local regional reorganization been added quarters Au, Jedesheim and Tiefenbach round the picture off to a grown whole one. Therefore, Illertissen was made to a town with around 16,000 inhabitants.

In the case of the district reorganization the former district capital Illertissen had to deliver some offices to the district of Neu-Ulm, but Illertissen did not lose its economical meaning as a regional middle center in the south district.

Main sights
Vöhlin Castle, developed in the 12th and 13th century as the "Castle of Tissen" of the Counts of Kirchberg. In 1525-1756 it was a possession of the patrician family Vöhlin from Memmingen. It houses a Rococo chapel and a bee museum.
Parish church St. Martin (1590), with high altar of the high renaissance, built by Christoph Rodt in 1604. 
Historical threshing floor (1847).
City hall (1891).

Transport 

Illertissen is served by the Neu-Ulm-Kempten railway.

The nearest international airports are located in: Memmingen (35 km), Friedrichshafen (99 km), Stuttgart (106 km) and Munich (173 km).

Twin cities
 Carnac, France
 Loket, Czech Republic

Sons and daughters of the town
 Marc Forster (born 1969), film director
 Johannes A. Jehle (born 1961), biologist, insect virologist and phytophysician
 Reiner Knizia (born 1957), game scout
 Verena Sailer (born 1985), athlete
 Volker Ulrich (born 1975), politician (CSU)

References

Castles in Bavaria
Neu-Ulm (district)